Dumitru Sigmirean (6 January 1959 – 12 November 2013) was a Romanian footballer, who primarily played as a midfielder.

Death
Sigmirean died of lung cancer on 12 November 2013, aged 54, in his hometown of Nuşeni, Bistrița-Năsăud County.

References

1959 births
2013 deaths
Deaths from lung cancer
Deaths from cancer in Romania
People from Bistrița-Năsăud County
Romanian footballers
Association football midfielders
Liga I players
Liga II players
ACF Gloria Bistrița players
FC Argeș Pitești players
FC Olt Scornicești players
FC Politehnica Iași (1945) players
Romanian football managers